The Chiesa della Immacolata or church of the Immaculate Conception is a baroque-style, Roman Catholic church in the town of Pioltello, region of Lombardy, Italy.

History
The church we see now was mainly erected in 1748. The church began as a family chapel commissioned by Elisabetta Giulia Ferrario Stoppani.

References

Churches in the metropolitan city of Milan
Baroque architecture in Lombardy
Roman Catholic churches completed in 1748
18th-century Roman Catholic church buildings in Italy
Pioltello